"Warlord" is the 52nd episode of Star Trek: Voyager, the tenth episode of the third season. This is a science fiction television episode, part of the Star Trek franchise, that aired on UPN on November 20, 1996. In this chapter the crew encounters the Ilari aliens, which commandeer Kes's body during political struggles on their homeworld. The crew works with factions of the aliens as Kes struggles to maintain control of her mind.

Summary
This show introduces the fictional Ilari aliens. They use advanced biotechnology to transfer a personality to another person. The show introduces the character Tieran, a former Ilari dictator. (Played by Leigh McCloskey and Jennifer Lien in different situations)

Guest stars include Anthony Crivello as Adin, Brad Greenquist as Demmas, Galyn Gorg as Nori, and Charles Emmett as Resh.

The story was written by Andrew Price and Mark Gabeman, with the teleplay by Lisa Klink. David Livingston directs.

Plot
The USS Voyager beams aboard three people just before their damaged ship explodes: an Ilari female named Nori, her injured spouse Tieran and an Ilari male named Adin. Although the Doctor and Kes try to save him, Tieran dies. Not long after, Neelix is shocked when Kes announces she'd like to spend some time apart from him. When Voyager arrives at Ilari, the local leader, known as "the Autarch," sends a representative to the ship instead of coming himself. Inexplicably, Kes pulls out a phaser, kills the representative and a crewmember, and escapes in a stolen shuttlecraft with Adin and Nori. The commander, Resh, is beamed aboard the shuttlecraft.

Kes takes the shuttle to a military encampment, meets with the commander, Resh, and takes command of the waiting troops. It's revealed that there is something in control of Kes' body. When Resh asks the entity in Kes why it took her for a host, since he considers a woman's body unfit for the job, it responds by making Resh's nose bleed. It then explains that Kes has telekinesis, which makes up for the physical weakness of the woman's body, as well as makes it useful for its plans. In the meantime, Janeway meets with Demmas, the Autarch's oldest son, who explains that Kes' body is now inhabited by Tieran, a former Ilarian ruler who was overthrown by Demmas' ancestor 200 years ago. Since then, Tieran has lived on by transferring his mind to a series of host bodies. Janeway agrees to help Demmas stop Kes/Tieran, but before she can, the tyrant has killed the Autarch in front of Demmas' younger brother, Ameron, and appointed himself the new Autarch.

Kes/Tieran tries to poison Ameron's thoughts against Demmas and urges him to cooperate with the new regime. In the meantime, the Doctor designs a synaptic stimulator that will remove Tieran's neural pattern from Kes—if they can get close enough to use it. Tuvok beams into the Autarch's palace, but is caught and imprisoned before he can succeed in the attempt. When Kes/Tieran interrogates Tuvok, the Vulcan is able to initiate a mind-meld and speak directly to Kes, who tells Tuvok she is fighting Tieran for control.

Kes/Tieran orders Voyager to leave orbit, but the stress of the mental battle between Kes and Tieran results in a paranoid Kes/Tieran killing Adin. To Nori's chagrin, Kes/Tieran announces she's marrying Ameron. Moments later, a coalition of Voyager's crew and Demmas' forces bursts into the palace. Resh tries to save Kes/Tieran, but is shot in the back with a phaser by Neelix.  Paris releases Tuvok, while Neelix places the synaptic stimulator on Kes/Tieran, forcing him from the body of the Ocampan woman. Tieran jumps to a new host body—Ameron—but Kes places the device on him and Tieran is finally destroyed. Demmas, the rightful heir, becomes Autarch. In a mind meld exercise with Tuvok, Kes sadly admits that she will not have the same relationship with her Voyager friends-especially Neelix (This foreshadows their breakup when her  growing mental powers cause her to leave Voyager and Neelix); Tuvok explains to her that she must use this life experience to learn from and grow.

Reception
The Nielsen rating for the episode when first broadcast on UPN was 4.7 points. 
Jim's Reviews summarized it as "Kes on power trip" and rated in 7.25 out 10. Jammer's Reviews gave it 2.5 out 4 stars, and praised Lien's acting.

Home media releases 
"Warlord" was released on DVD on July 6, 2004 as part of Star Trek Voyager: Complete Third Season, with Dolby 5.1 surround audio. The season 3 DVD was released in the UK on September 6, 2004.

In 2017, the complete Star Trek: Voyager television series was released in a DVD box set , which included "Warlord" as part of the season 3 discs.

"Flashback" was released on LaserDisc in Japan on June 25, 1999, as part of the 3rd season vol.1 set.

References

External links
 

Star Trek: Voyager (season 3) episodes
1996 American television episodes
Television episodes about terrorism
Television episodes directed by David Livingston